Morningside is one of the seventeen wards used to elect members of the City of Edinburgh Council. Established in 2007 along with the other wards, it elects four Councillors. As its name suggests, the ward's territory is based around the community of Morningside to the south of the city centre, also including Braid Hills, Bruntsfield, Burghmuirhead (Church Hill and Holy Corner), Greenbank, Greenhill, Marchmont, Merchiston and Polwarth.

A minor 2017 boundary change in the north of the ward saw the loss of the densely-populated Tollcross neighbourhood, but the overall population increased slightly due to housebuilding in other areas. At that time, the ward's name was also amended from its original title of Morningside/Meadows – the well-known Meadows park area to which this referred had never been fully within its boundaries. In 2019, the ward had a population of 32,586.

Councillors

Election results

2022 election
2022 City of Edinburgh Council election

2017 election
2017 City of Edinburgh Council election

2012 election
2012 City of Edinburgh Council election

2007 election
2007 City of Edinburgh Council election

References

External links
Listed Buildings in Morningside Ward, City of Edinburgh at British Listed Buildings

Wards of Edinburgh